Wapi Rural LLG is a local-level government (LLG) of Morobe Province, Papua New Guinea.

Wards
01. Watama
02. Hanjua
03. Wauwoka
04. Womei
05. Tamoi
06. Yakepa
07. Akwanja
08. Topa
09. Mabukapa
10. Aiyogi
11. Sikwong 1
12. Sikwong 2
13. Kapini
14. Himerka
15. Gebgya

References

Local-level governments of Morobe Province